Elaheh Koulaei (born 17 December 1956) is an Iranian political scientist,  reformist intellectual.

Dr Koulaei is a professor of political science at Tehran University, and a member of the Islamic Iran Participation Front. She was one of the 513 women candidates for election to the Iranian parliament, and was a member of the sixth parliament of the Islamic Republic of Iran.

Elaheh Koulaei was head of the Irano-Libya Parliamentarian Friendship Group in Iran in 2003.

References

See also 
 Iranian women
 List of famous Persian women
 Persian women's movement

Iranian political scientists
Iranian women's rights activists
Academic staff of the University of Tehran
Iranian democracy activists
1956 births
Living people
Iranian women academics
Academic staff of the Islamic Azad University, Central Tehran Branch
Islamic Iran Participation Front politicians
Members of the 6th Islamic Consultative Assembly
Members of the Women's fraction of Islamic Consultative Assembly
Union of Islamic Iran People Party politicians
Members of the Reformists' Supreme Council for Policymaking
21st-century Iranian women politicians
21st-century Iranian politicians
Islamic Association of University Instructors politicians
Women political scientists